Marcus Thomas Morris Sr. (born September 2, 1989) is an American professional basketball player for the Los Angeles Clippers  of the National Basketball Association (NBA). The forward played college basketball at Kansas before being drafted 14th overall by the Houston Rockets in the 2011 NBA draft. He has also played for the Phoenix Suns, Detroit Pistons, Boston Celtics, and New York Knicks.

Early life
Morris was born in Philadelphia, Pennsylvania, to Thomasine "Angel" Morris. He has four brothers, Donte, Blake, David and twin Markieff, who also plays in the NBA.

Considered a four-star recruit by Rivals.com, Morris was listed as the No. 10 power forward and the No. 29 player in the nation in 2008.

College career

Morris attended the University of Kansas, where he majored in American studies. He was named the 2010–11 Big 12 Conference Men's Basketball Player of the Year. He also was named a second team All-American for his play in the 2010–11 basketball season by both the Associated Press and the National Association of Basketball Coaches, and a third team All-America by Fox Sports. On March 30, 2011, Morris was named to the ten-member John R. Wooden Award Men's All American team. Morris and his brother signed with a sports agent from Los Angeles, and announced that they would enter the 2011 NBA draft.

Professional career

Houston Rockets (2011–2013)
Morris was selected by the Houston Rockets with the 14th overall pick in the 2011 NBA draft, five minutes after his brother Markieff was taken with the 13th pick by the Phoenix Suns. He was assigned to the Rio Grande Valley Vipers of the NBA Development League on January 2, 2012. In his first game in the D-League on January 6, 2012, Morris recorded 33 points and 16 rebounds in a narrow 105–103 loss to the Dakota Wizards. Morris returned to the Rockets on January 16, was reassigned to the Rio Grande Valley Vipers on February 3, and returned to the Rockets again on February 20.

After an injury to Patrick Patterson, Rockets head coach Kevin McHale named Morris the opening day starter at power forward for the 2012–13 season. When told he would be starting, Morris thought McHale was kidding, since he rarely played his rookie season and was hurt during the preseason. During the course of the season, Morris was the backup power forward to Patterson, and started 17 games while Patterson was injured. His three-point shot was much improved from his rookie season, more than tripling the percentage from 12% to 38%.

Phoenix Suns (2013–2015)
On February 21, 2013, Morris was traded to the Phoenix Suns, reuniting him with his twin brother. A day later, he played his first game with his brother in the last 6 minutes of a loss to the Boston Celtics, as he recorded 7 points, 2 steals, and a rebound, despite having no formal training from the Suns before entering the game. This marked the second time that twin brothers played for the same NBA team; Dick and Tom Van Arsdale also played together for the Suns during the 1976–77 season. On March 1, 2013, Morris scored 16 points to help the Suns defeat the Atlanta Hawks 92–87. He made four out of five three-point attempts. He went on to start alongside Markieff on March 10, 2013 against his former team, the Rockets, which made the Morris twins the first set of twin brothers to ever start for the same NBA team.

On September 29, 2014, Morris signed a multi-year contract extension with the Suns. In the Suns' 2014–15 season opener on October 29, 2014, Morris recorded 21 points in the 119–99 win over the Los Angeles Lakers. During the Suns' January 7 game against the Minnesota Timberwolves, Morris received a technical foul and was caught on national TV berating head coach Jeff Hornacek about the situation. It resulted in Morris not playing for the rest of the game. His other antics during his final season with the Suns and afterwards, though, led to AZCentral.com labeling him one of Arizona's biggest sports villains.

On February 6, 2015, Morris recorded his first career double-double with career highs of 34 points and 12 rebounds in a 100–93 win over the Utah Jazz. His double-double off the bench marked him as just the second player after Brook Lopez in 2014–15 to record a 30-point, 10-rebound game off the bench. The last Suns player to do it was Danny Manning in 1997. In a March 22 game against the Dallas Mavericks, the Morris twins had double-doubles in the same game for the first time in their professional careers.

Detroit Pistons (2015–2017)

On July 9, 2015, Morris was traded to the Detroit Pistons, along with Reggie Bullock and Danny Granger, in exchange for a 2020 second-round draft pick. He made his debut for the Pistons on October 27, 2015, in the team's season opener against the Atlanta Hawks. In 37 minutes of action as a starter, he recorded 18 points and 10 rebounds in a 106–94 win. On April 1, 2016, he scored a season-high 31 points in a 98–89 loss to the Dallas Mavericks. The Pistons finished the regular season as the eighth seed in the Eastern Conference with a 44–38 record, earning a playoff berth for the first time since 2009. In their first-round series against the top-seeded, eventual champion Cleveland Cavaliers, the Pistons were swept 4–0.

On February 3, 2017, Morris scored a career-high 36 points in a 116–108 win over the Minnesota Timberwolves. On February 28, Morris set a new career high with 37 points in a 120–113 overtime win over the Portland Trail Blazers.

Boston Celtics (2017–2019)
On July 7, 2017, Morris was traded to the Boston Celtics in exchange for Avery Bradley and a 2019 second-round draft pick. On March 31, 2018, he scored 25 points in a 110–99 win over the Toronto Raptors. It was his fourth straight game with at least 20 points, setting a career high.

New York Knicks (2019–2020)
On July 16, 2019, Morris signed with the New York Knicks. On January 5, 2020, Morris scored a career-high 38 points and tied his career high for field goals made (13) in a 135–132 loss against the Los Angeles Clippers.

Los Angeles Clippers (2020–present)
The Knicks traded Morris to the Los Angeles Clippers in a three team trade with the Washington Wizards on February 6, 2020, sending Maurice Harkless to New York and Jerome Robinson to Washington; the Clippers also acquired Isaiah Thomas from the Wizards in the trade.

Morris debuted for the Clippers on February 9, 2020, scoring 10 points in a 133–92 victory over the Cleveland Cavaliers. In the first round of the 2020 NBA playoffs, Morris was ejected during game 6 after he committed a flagrant foul on Luka Dončić and was fined $35,000, but was never suspended. In the 2020 Western Conference Semifinals, Morris notably had an altercation with Paul Millsap as the Clippers fell in seven games after the Nuggets came back from a 3–1 series deficit. Morris averaged 11.8 points and 4.8 rebounds during the playoffs.

On November 25, 2020, Morris re-signed with the Clippers with a 4-year, $64 million contract.

Career statistics

NBA

Regular season

|-
| style="text-align:left;"|
| style="text-align:left;"|Houston
| 17 || 0 || 7.4 || .296 || .118 || .750 || .9 || .2 || .1 || .1 || 2.4
|-
| style="text-align:left;"rowspan=2|
| style="text-align:left;"|Houston
| 54 || 17 || 21.4 || .428 || .381 || .653 || 4.1 || .9 || .5 || .3 || 8.6
|-
| style="text-align:left;"|Phoenix
| 23 || 6 || 16.1 || .405 || .308 || .405 || 2.5 || .7 || .8 || .2 || 5.7
|-
| style="text-align:left;"|
| style="text-align:left;"|Phoenix
| 82 || 1 || 22.0 || .442 || .381 || .761 || 3.9 || 1.1 || .9 || .2 || 9.7
|-
| style="text-align:left;"|
| style="text-align:left;"|Phoenix
| 81 || 35 || 25.2 || .434 || .358 || .628 || 4.8 || 1.6 || .8 || .2 || 10.4
|-
| style="text-align:left;"|
| style="text-align:left;"|Detroit
| 80 || 80 || 35.7 || .434 || .362 || .749 || 5.1 || 2.5 || .8 || .3 || 14.1
|-
| style="text-align:left;"|
| style="text-align:left;"|Detroit
| 79 || 79 || 32.5 || .418 || .331 || .784 || 4.6 || 2.0 || .7 || .3 || 14.0
|-
| style="text-align:left;"|
| style="text-align:left;"|Boston
| 54 || 21 || 26.8 || .429 || .368 || .805 || 5.4 || 1.3 || .6 || .2 || 13.6
|-
| style="text-align:left;"|
| style="text-align:left;"|Boston
| 75 || 53 || 27.9 ||  .447 || .375 || .844 || 6.1 || 1.5 || .6 ||  .3 || 13.9
|-
| style="text-align:left;"rowspan=2|
| style="text-align:left;"|New York
| 43 || 43 || 32.3 ||  .442 || .439 || .823 || 5.4 || 1.4 || .8 ||  .4 || 19.6
|-
| style="text-align:left;"|L.A. Clippers
| 19 || 19 || 28.9 ||  .425 || .310 || .818 || 4.1 || 1.4 || .7 ||  .7 || 10.1
|-
| style="text-align:left;"|
| style="text-align:left;"|L.A. Clippers
| 57 || 29 || 26.4 || .473 || .473 || .820 || 4.1 || 1.0 || .6 || .3 || 13.4
|-
| style="text-align:left;"|
| style="text-align:left;"|L.A. Clippers
| 54 || 54 || 29.0 || .434 || .367 || .872 || 4.4 || 2.1 || .5 || .3 || 15.4
|- class="sortbottom"
| style="text-align:center;" colspan="2"|Career
| 718 || 437 || 27.1 || .435 || .377 || .773 || 4.6 || 1.5 || .7 || .3 || 12.4

Playoffs

|-
| style="text-align:left;"|2016
| style="text-align:left;"|Detroit
| 4 || 4 || 36.0 || .468 || .389 || .870 || 3.3 || 2.5 || .5 || .0 || 17.8
|-
| style="text-align:left;"|2018
| style="text-align:left;"|Boston
| 19 || 4 || 29.6 || .368 || .417 || .712 || 5.4 || 1.1 || .4 || .3 || 12.4
|-
| style="text-align:left;"|2019
| style="text-align:left;"|Boston
| 9 || 4 || 28.2 || .519 || .450 || .742 || 8.1 || 1.2 || .1 || .6 || 13.7
|-
| style="text-align:left;"|2020
| style="text-align:left;"|L.A. Clippers
| 13 || 13 || 29.8 || .505 || .475 || .929 || 4.8 || 1.6 || .8 || .1 || 11.8
|-
| style="text-align:left;"|2021
| style="text-align:left;"|L.A. Clippers
| 19 || 18 || 31.8 || .430 || .375 || .750 || 4.3 || 1.5 || .5 || .5 || 12.2
|- class="sortbottom"
| style="text-align:center;" colspan="2"|Career
| 64 || 43 || 30.5 || .435 || .418 || .767 || 5.2 || 1.4 || .5 || .3 || 12.7

College

|-
| style="text-align:left;"|2008–09
| style="text-align:left;"|Kansas
| 35 || 22 || 18.5 || .495 || .400 || .604 || 4.7 || 1.1 || 1.0 || .3 || 7.4
|-
| style="text-align:left;"|2009–10
| style="text-align:left;"|Kansas
| 36 || 33 || 24.7 || .570 || .375 || .660 || 6.1 || 1.0 || .9 || .3 || 12.8
|-
| style="text-align:left;"|2010–11
| style="text-align:left;"|Kansas
| 38 || 36 || 28.3 || .570 || .342 || .688 || 7.6 || 1.6 || .8 || .6 || 17.2
|- class="sortbottom"
| style="text-align:center;" colspan="2"|Career
| 109 || 91 || 24.0 || .555 || .358 || .660 || 6.2 || 1.3 || .9 || .4 || 12.6

Personal life
Morris is seven minutes younger than his identical twin brother, Markieff. He is a fan of his hometown Philadelphia Eagles while Markieff roots for the rival Dallas Cowboys. His nicknames are "Mook" and "Flask Dad". Morris' girlfriend Amber Soulds gave birth to a son, Marcus Jr., on July 20, 2018. Beginning with the 2018–19 season, Morris donned "Morris Sr." on the back of his gameday jersey.

The Morris brothers and former teammates Goran and Zoran Dragić all briefly played for the Suns during the fourth quarter of the team's January 2, 2015 112–96 victory over the Philadelphia 76ers. It marked the first time in the NBA's history that two pairs of brothers were on the court for the same team at the same time.

On February 26, 2012, the state of Kansas filed battery charges against Morris and another assailant, Julius K. Harris, for punching an employee of the Cave, a bar and nightclub in Lawrence, Kansas in which they had been watching the final Border War basketball match between Kansas and Missouri. Morris and Harris entered a diversion agreement for the battery charge, with Morris paying a $300 diversion fee, $60 in court fees, and agreeing not to come in contact with the victim or The Cave for one year.

On January 24, 2015, Marcus and Markieff Morris were involved in two aggravated assault cases as five different men (including the twins and former Baltimore Ravens safety Gerald Bowman) allegedly assaulted 36-year-old Eric Hood outside the Nina Mason Pulliam Recreation Center in Phoenix, Arizona. Hood mentored the Morris twins from high school until the end of their college careers; the brothers assaulted Hood for "sending an inappropriate text message" to their mother. The case against the Morris brothers was first brought on August 3, 2015; the trial concluded on October 3, 2017, with the twins and Gerald Bowman found not guilty and the accused Julius Kane and Christopher Melendez Jr. confessing their guilt in September 2017. In spite of the resolution the incident was considered a catalyst for the Suns trading Marcus to the Pistons on July 9, 2015 and a factor in dealing his brother to the Washington Wizards on February 18, 2016.

References

External links

 Kansas Jayhawks bio
 Marcus Morris deserves place in pantheon

1989 births
Living people
All-American college men's basketball players
American men's basketball players
Basketball players from Philadelphia
Boston Celtics players
Detroit Pistons players
Houston Rockets draft picks
Houston Rockets players
Identical twins
Kansas Jayhawks men's basketball players
Los Angeles Clippers players
New York Knicks players
Phoenix Suns players
Power forwards (basketball)
Rio Grande Valley Vipers players
American twins
Twin sportspeople